Bradina extenuatalis is a moth in the family Crambidae. It was described by Francis Walker in 1865. It is found on the Sula Islands and in Papua New Guinea.

References

Moths described in 1865
Bradina